Anders Ohlsén (born June 23, 1964) is a Swedish sprint canoer who competed in the late 1980s and early 1990s. Competing in two Summer Olympics, he earned his best finish of seventh twice (1988: K-2 1000 m, 1992: K-4 1000 m).

References
Sports-Reference.com profile

1964 births
Canoeists at the 1988 Summer Olympics
Canoeists at the 1992 Summer Olympics
Living people
Olympic canoeists of Sweden
Swedish male canoeists